The 2022–23 PAOK FC season is the club's 97th season in existence and the club's 64th consecutive season in the top flight of Greek football. In addition to the domestic league, PAOK are participating in this season's editions of the Greek Cup and in the Europa Conference League. The season covers the period from 21 July 2022 to 30 June 2023.

Coaching staff

Players

Current squad

Transfers

In

Out

Transferfee for Koutsias is about 2,3 in €.

Pre-season and other friendlies

Competitions

Overview

Managerial statistics

Last updated: 12 March 2023

Super League Greece

League table

Matches

Results summary

Results by round

Greek Cup

Round of 16

Quarter-finals

Semi-finals

UEFA Europa Conference League

Second qualifying round

Statistics

Squad statistics
 
The squad was informed and the official page of PAOK FC.

! colspan="13" style="background:#DCDCDC; text-align:center" | Goalkeepers
|-

! colspan="13" style="background:#DCDCDC; text-align:center" | Defenders
|-

! colspan="13" style="background:#DCDCDC; text-align:center" | Midfielders
|-

! colspan="13" style="background:#DCDCDC; text-align:center" | Forwards
|-

! colspan="13" style="background:#DCDCDC; text-align:center" | Players transferred out during the season
|-

|}

Goalscorers

As of 8 March 2023

Clean sheets
As of 8 March 2023

Disciplinary record
As of 8 March 2023

References

External links

PAOK FC seasons
PAOK
PAOK